Pragathi Nagar is a residential colony in Kukatpally, Hyderabad, India. It is a residential suburb in Kukatpally and is situated at a distance of around 3.4 kilometres from the Kukatpally locality on National Highway 9 which leads to the city of Mumbai. It is situated at around 2 and half kilometers from the Jawaharlal Nehru Technological University, Hyderabad.

Geography
Pragathi Nagar is located at east of National Highway 9. It has an average elevation of 33 metres (108 ft) and is situated on the plains. Summers are lengthy and humid. Average January temperature is about 35 °C, July is 38 °C.

Transport
Basic transportation is served and is provided by state government under taking, department of public  transportation agency, TSRTC.  
Being part of Greater Hyderabad and its strategic geographical location with proximity being close to major IT/ITES, Biotech, Pharma industries etc., residents of Pragathi Nagar will have easy access to the Hyderabad Metro Rail project. Access to Metro Rail will help residents to reach the other end of the greater Hyderabad in less than one hour.

Fitness Studios

 Stark Fitness Studio
 Jaguar Gym
 CrossXFit Box

Economy
Real estate and construction contributes to majority of economy.

See also
People's Hospital, Pragathi Nagar
QuriosEATY your daily meal partner. "you are What you eat": This 'takeaway' is perfect place to have one's daily meal.

References

Neighbourhoods in Hyderabad, India